Ochman is the debut studio album by Polish-American singer Ochman. It was released by Universal Music Polska on 19 November 2021.

Ochman is a combination of pop, classical crossover and trip hop. The album was produced by @atutowy, Tomasz Kulik, Karol Serek, Paweł Wawrzeńczyk, Dominic Buczkowski-Wojtaszek, Patryk Kumór, Juliusz Kamil, Michał Pietrzak, Mikołaj Trybulec and Liker$.

It peaked at number five on the Polish albums chart and has been certified gold.

Track listing

Charts

Weekly charts

Year-end charts

Certifications

Release history

References

2021 debut albums
Polish-language albums
Universal Music Group albums